Pyeonghwa Motors (Hangul : 평화자동차) (Hancha : 平和自動車), a Korean language word for "peace", also spelled Pyonghwa, is one of the two car manufacturers and dealers in the North Korean automotive industry, alongside Sungri Motor Plant. Until 2013, it was a joint venture in Nampo between Pyonghwa Motors of Seoul (South Korea), a company owned by Sun Myung Moon's Unification Church, and the North Korean Ryonbong General Corp. The joint venture produced small cars under licence from Fiat and Brilliance China Auto, a pickup truck and an SUV using complete knock down kits from Chinese manufacturer Dandong Shuguang, and a luxury car of SsangYong design. From 2013, the company has been fully owned by the North Korean state.

Pyeonghwa has the exclusive rights to car production, purchase, and sale of used cars in North Korea. However, most North Koreans are unable to afford a car. Because of the very small market for cars in the country, Pyeonghwa's output is reportedly very low. In 2003, only 314 cars were produced even though the factory had the facilities to produce up to 10,000 cars a year.

Erik van Ingen Schenau, author of the book Automobiles Made in North Korea, has estimated the company's total production in 2005 at not more than around 400 units.

History
Pyeonghwa Motors was officially founded by the Unification Church. The venture came during the period of the Sunshine Policy between North and South Korea, when sanctions on the country were not as tough. The venture was announced in 2000 .

In 2002, around $55 million to build the factory, with the first production line in Nampo was completed and the first Hwiparam was produced The Premio and Pronto introduced in 2004.

In 2009, PM earned about $700,000 from the sale of 650 cars, $500,000 remitted to South Korea Park Sang-Kwon, Pyeonghwa Motors president, started talks to end investment in 2012.

The Unification Church officially transferred all investment to Pyongyang in 2013.

Model list

 Hwiparam I, 2000, based on the Fiat Siena.
 Hwiparam II, 2007, based on the Brilliance Junjie/BS4/M2.
 Hwiparam III, 2010, based on the Brilliance FSV.
 Bbeokgugi (Peokkugi) 1, 2003, based on the Fiat Doblò. Known to keep the Fiat vehicle badge.
 Bbeokgugi (Peokkugi) 2, 2004, based on the Shuguang SUV 4x2.
 Bbeokgugi (Peokkugi) 3, 2004, based on the Shuguang Huanghai.
 Bbeokgugi (Peokkugi) 4, 2005, based on the Shuguang Dawn.
 Junma, 2005-2006, series production of the Junma, based on the SsangYong Chairman.
 Junma (Zunma 1606), 2013, based on the FAW-Volkswagen Sagitar.
 Junma (Zunma 2008), 2013, based on the FAW-Volkswagen CC
 Samcheonri,  2005, based on the Jinbei Haise.

Further models and partnerships
In summer 2006, the North Korean government magazine Foreign Trade, which advertises North Korean products, published a photograph of a new luxury car produced by Pyeonghwa, the Junma, which appears to be a rebadged version of the South Korean SsangYong Chairman.

The Chairman bears a strong resemblance to SsangYong cars, which are favored by North Korean government officials. The Junma is based on an old Mercedes E-Class design.

In 2006, Pyeonghwa reached an agreement with Chinese manufacturer Brilliance China Auto to assemble its Jinbei Haise vans, which are based on an old version of the Toyota HiAce.

In 2007, Pyeonghwa introduced Brilliance's Junjie car under the name Hwiparam II. The original Fiat-based Hwiparam has appeared on Pyeonghwa's web site.

In 2009, Pyeonghwa announced a profit on its North Korean operations.

The Premio and Pronto are also sold in Vietnam by Mekong Auto. Both are based on Huanghai vehicles. Mekong Auto has sold Fiat cars in Vietnam since 1995, and this relationship may have led to Pyeonghwa assembling Fiats in North Korea.

Advertising
Pyeonghwa is currently the only company in North Korea to advertise. A series of billboards and TV commercials have been made in an effort to show residents that their country is able to produce products such as motor vehicles. The ads may be aimed primarily at expatriate businessmen in Pyongyang, but Car and Driver magazine suggests that they are actually propaganda aimed at the local population, to make them believe that their country is economically successful.

See also

 Unification Church and North Korea

References

External links

 
 Pyongwha brochure (PDF) on the Korean Friendship Association website
 Photos of North Korean vehicles including Pyeonghwa models, compiled by the author of Automobiles Made in North Korea
 Pyeonghwa Motors video advertisement
 Location of Pyeonghwa motors plant in Nampo: 

Nampo
Unification Church affiliated organizations
Unification Church controversies
Car manufacturers of North Korea
Manufacturing companies based in Seoul
Luxury motor vehicle manufacturers
Vehicle manufacturing companies established in 1999
North Korea–South Korea relations
Government-owned companies of North Korea
1999 establishments in North Korea